This is a list of episodes of the British television drama series Jonathan Creek, a British mystery crime drama series produced by the BBC and written by David Renwick. It stars Alan Davies as the title character, who works as a creative consultant to a stage magician while also solving seemingly supernatural mysteries through his talent for logical deduction and his understanding of illusions.

Series overview

Episodes

Series 1 (1997)

Series 2 (1998)

Christmas Special (1998)

Series 3 (1999–2000)

Christmas Special (2001)

Series 4 (2003–2004)

Specials (2009–2013)

Series 5 (2014)

Christmas Special (2016)

Ratings

References

BBC-related lists
Lists of British comedy-drama television series episodes
Lists of British crime drama television series episodes
Lists of British mystery television series episodes